Hamzeh Mohammadi is an Iranian Paralympic powerlifter. He represented Iran at the 2004 Summer Paralympics, at the 2008 Summer Paralympics and at the 2016 Summer Paralympics and he won two medals: the bronze medal in the men's 67.5 kg event in 2004 and the gold medal in the men's 60 kg event in 2008.

At the 2014 World Championships held in Dubai, United Arab Emirates, he won the silver medal in the men's 59 kg event.

References

External links 
 

Living people
Year of birth missing (living people)
Place of birth missing (living people)
Powerlifters at the 2004 Summer Paralympics
Powerlifters at the 2008 Summer Paralympics
Powerlifters at the 2016 Summer Paralympics
Medalists at the 2004 Summer Paralympics
Medalists at the 2008 Summer Paralympics
Paralympic gold medalists for Iran
Paralympic bronze medalists for Iran
Paralympic medalists in powerlifting
Paralympic powerlifters of Iran
21st-century Iranian people